Vexillum chickcharneorum is a species of small sea snail, marine gastropod mollusk in the family Costellariidae, the ribbed miters.

Description
The length of the shell attains 9.4 mm.

Distribution
This marine species occurs off the Bahamas.

References

External links
 Lyons, William G.; Kaicher, Sally D.(1978) - A New Vexillum of the Subgenus Pusia (Gastropoda: Vexillidae) from the Bahamas; Bulletin of Marine Science, Volume 28, Number 3, July 1978, pp. 543-549(7)

chickcharneorum
Gastropods described in 1978